The Air Wing of the Armed Forces of Malta is the aerial component of the current Maltese military. The Air Wing has responsibility for the security of Maltese airspace, conducts maritime patrol and Search and Rescue duties, medical evacuation, VIP transport and provides military assistance to other government departments of Malta.

The Air Wing of the Armed Forces is based at the AFM terminal at the Malta International Airport.

History 

While Malta has a rather long tradition of military aviation within its territory, including the housing of Royal Air Force bases and squadrons during World War II, the nation had no official military aviation of its own until gaining independence in 1964 (and the building of an independent national military that followed).

The Air Wing was founded as an operational branch of the Armed Forces of Malta in the early 1970s. The Air Wing serves primarily as a support branch of the ground forces (as troops transport, security escort and fire support) and Maritime Squadron of the AFM (for maritime surveillance and border control mission) and has so far never operated combat aircraft. The Air Wing's current Commanding Officer is Lt. Col James Thomas Grech.

On 13 December 2013, the Air Wing of the AFM was awarded the 'Midalja għall-Qadi tar-Repubblika' (MQR) in recognition of its distinguished service toward safety at sea, humanitarian assistance to people in distress and to the welfare of Maltese people.

In a bilateral agreement with Italy, the Italian Air Force provided two AB 212 helicopters to perform SAR duties with Maltese rescuers on board. This was operated under the name of Italian Military in Malta which was initially intended to help the Maltese Government establish and maintain a modern military force as well operate a SAR detachment. This lasted more than 40 years with the Italian AB212's and their predecessors the AB 204 logging over 15,000 flight hours in both training and SAR missions whilst saving over 270 people. By 2015 the intended role of this mission had been fulfilled with the Maltese Air Wing able to operate a modern SAR force and due to budget cuts the mission started to wind down until eventually the final chapter of service was closed in 2016 with the Italian AB212's going home.

Structure 
The main divisions of the Air Wing are :

 The Air Wing Headquarters – Tasked with command, control, and coordination of the air wing's divisions and sub-units, in order to ensure unit readiness for responding to various operational requirements, both locally and overseas.
 The Headquarters Squadron – Provides logistical and service support to the other sub-units of the AFM Air Wing. It is responsible for transport management, logistics procurement, and human resources administration required for the air wing's daily duties and commitments. The Integrated Logistics Division within the Headquarters Squadron is tasked with ensuring of the stocking up of all aircraft parts and aircraft maintenance documentation.
 The Operations Squadron – The main operations element of the AFM's Air Wing, in charge of utilizing the aircraft inventory. It consists of three subdivisions :
 The Fixed Wing Flight – In charge of coastal and offshore patrolling, sighting and reporting of irregular migration at sea and interdiction, fisheries patrols, and several other varied flight duties.
 The Rotary Wing Flight – Handles all helicopter operations, ranging from offshore casualty evacuation and rescue to air ambulance as well as patient transfer between the Islands' two main hospitals. It also provides assistance to other government entities as required.
 The Rescue Section – A small unit of soldiers and rescue personnel specially trained for rescue operations on land and at sea. Each rescue-swimmer is qualified in first aid, life saving, and other specialist skills. Membership in the unit requires a high level of physical fitness.
 The Support Squadron – By far the largest of the Air Wing's divisions, the Support Squadron is in charge of the maintenance of the aircraft inventory.  The ground crew personnel are also responsible for aircraft and equipment handling on the ground, emergency fire fighting, aircraft marshalling, aircraft towing, aircraft refuelling, and other essential line duties.

Aircraft
Below is a list of aircraft operated by the Armed Forces of Malta Air Wing.  The Air Wing operates 4 fixed-wing aircraft and 6 helicopters. Since its founding, the Air Wing has never operated jet-powered or combat aircraft.

Current inventory

Retired

References

External links 

Overview of the AFM Air Wing at the official AFM website
Overview of AFM AW aircraft at the official AFM website

Malta
Military of Malta
Military units and formations established in 1973